Roll's Regiment (also de Roll's or von Roll's Regiment) was a regiment of the British Army formed of Swiss, French and German soldiers raised in 1794 for service in the French Revolutionary Wars. The regiment's colonel was Louis de Roll, a former officer of the pre-revolutionary French Swiss Guards. The unit served in various garrisons in the Mediterranean and saw action in Tuscany before being reduced to a single battalion. The regiment was dispatched to Egypt in 1800 to oppose the French occupation and distinguished itself in action at the Battle of Alexandria.  The regiment received drafts of French and Polish prisoners of war to replace its losses and in 1810 participated in the British invasion of the Septinsular Republic.  The regiment served in Sicily as guard to Ferdinand IV of Naples before joining the Peninsular War.  It saw action at the capture of Fort St Felipe (near Tortosa) and the 1813 Siege of Tarragona.  The regiment disbanded at Corfu in 1815 following the end of the Napoleonic Wars.

Formation 
One regiment of two battalions was raised by Louis de Roll, an ex-officer of Louis XVI's Swiss Guards, in Switzerland on 9 December 1794.  The regiment seems to have formed a part of the British Army unlike some other foreign-raised units in British service.  It came under the command of British generals, was funded by the British government and appeared on the Army List of 1815.  The regiment was formed of two battalions each of ten companies (including grenadier and light companies) and had an authorised strength of 1,698 men.  De Roll, who served as colonel, had requested that the British Army release all Swiss prisoners of war to him for incorporation into the regiment but this was not authorised and most of the men were recruited by traditional means from Switzerland, Alsace and Germany.  The uniform was the usual British Army red coat with royal blue facings and silver lace, with the facings being changed to sky blue in 1801.  The Colonel of the Regiment was Francis de Rottenburg, Baron Rottenburg.

French Revolutionary Wars
The regiment was stationed in the Anglo-Corsican Kingdom from April to October 1796, prior to the British withdrawal from the island.  It was then moved to Elba from which two companies conducted raids on the Tuscan coast in November 1796.  Following the evacuation of that island in April 1797 the regiment was sent to Portugal where, in November 1798, it was reduced in strength to a single battalion.  The regiment was at Minorca in September 1799 and Gibraltar in October 1800 before it was sent, under General Ralph Abercromby to fight French forces in Egypt.  At this point De Roll appointed Jost Dürler, who commanded the rearguard of the Swiss during the defence of the Tuileries, as colonel – having previously served as a lieutenant-colonel.

The regiment was engaged at the Battle of Alexandria on 21 March 1801 and performed commendably in action.  Some of the officers were awarded the Order of the Crescent by Ottoman Sultan Selim III for their distinguished service.  The regiment was accorded the honour of incorporating a sphinx and the Egypt battle honour onto their regimental colour.  The unit remained in Egypt until June 1803 when it returned to Gibraltar.  Roll's Regiment suffered around 40% casualties in the Egyptian campaign and to augment its strength some French prisoners of war were recruited into its ranks, including at least 45 Poles.  The battalion commanding officer Lieutenant-Colonel Jost Dürler was killed at Alexandria and was replaced on 25 September 1802 by Alphonse, Baron de Sonneberg.

Napoleonic Wars 
Roll's Regiment took part in the British invasion of the French-controlled Septinsular Republic (the Ionian Islands) in 1810 and then, until 1812, was at Sicily guarding Ferdinand IV of Naples.  On 7 March 1811 de Sonneberg was succeeded as lieutenant-colonel by Frederick, Baron Eben.  Roll's regiment was fighting in the Peninsular War by 2 June 1813 when it was formed into a joint battalion with Dillon's Regiment  (another foreign regiment in British service).  It formed part of Colonel William Prevost's brigade alongside the 67th Regiment of Foot, some artillery and engineers.  The regiment captured Fort St Felipe, near Tortosa on 7 June and was present at the unsuccessful Siege of Tarragona (ended 11 June).  In April 1814 part of the regiment, amounting to four companies, were formed into a battalion of detachments with Dillon's regiment and the 67th.  The regiment returned to Sicily in 1814, where it was reunited with its detachments, and was disbanded at Corfu in 1815.

References 

Regiments of the British Army
Military units and formations established in 1794
Military units and formations disestablished in 1815
Swiss mercenaries
Counter-revolutionary military units and formations of France
Foreign regiments in British Service